A Full Day's Work is a 1973 French-Italian comedy film directed by Jean-Louis Trintignant.

Cast 
 Jacques Dufilho - Jean Rousseau
 Luce Marquand - La Mère Rousseau
 Franco Pesce - Le père de Jean Rousseau
 Albin Guichard - Jean Rousseau, 15 ans plus tot
 Andrée Bernard - La mère Rousseau, 15 ans plus tot
 Louis Malignon - Le père Rousseau, 15 ans plus tot
 T. Requenae - Le fils Fernand Rousseau, 15 ans plus tot
 Jacques Doniol-Valcroze - Le juré Jacquemont, l'acteur jouant Hamlet
 Antoine Marin - Le Juré Albert Roux / l'autre Roux
 Pierre Dominique - Le juré maître-nageur
 Vittorio Caprioli - Le Juré Mangiavacca

References

External links 

1973 comedy films
1973 films
French comedy films
Italian comedy films
1970s French-language films
1970s Italian films
1970s French films